USS Watchman (AGR-16) was a , converted from a Liberty Ship, acquired by the US Navy in 1958. She was reconfigured as a radar picket ship and assigned to radar picket duty in the North Pacific Ocean as part of the Distant Early Warning Line.

Construction
Watchman (YAGR-16) was laid down on 17 January 1945, under a Maritime Commission (MARCOM) contract, MC hull 2343, as the Liberty Ship Vernon S. Hood, by J.A. Jones Construction, Panama City, Florida. She was launched 20 February 1945; sponsored by Mrs. Inez Bulifant; and delivered 7 March 1945, to MARCOM.

Service history

Merchant service
Following a shakedown cruise in the Gulf of Mexico, the freighter was turned over to the Overlakes Freight Corporation, to be operated by that firm under a contract with the MARCOM. During her brief period of active operations with MARCOM, 1945 to 1947, she also served under contract with the Moore-McCormack Lines. Later that year, she was placed out of service and was berthed with the James River Reserve Fleet, Lee Hall, Virginia.

U.S. Navy service
The ship remained there until mid-1958 when she was taken over by the US Navy and converted to a radar picket ship at the Charleston Navy Yard, Charleston, South Carolina. During conversion, she was renamed Watchman and received the designation YAGR-16. However, that designation was changed to AGR-16 before she completed her conversion late in the year. On 5 January 1958, Watchman was placed in commission at Charleston.
 
Watchman conducted shakedown training in the Guantanamo Bay operating area during February. Following post-shakedown availability at Charleston, from 5 to 18 March, she completed repairs and got underway for the US West Coast. After transiting the Panama Canal, and visiting Acapulco, Mexico, she arrived in her new home port, San Francisco, California, on 11 April.

Assigned to the Continental Air Defense Command (CONAD), she served as one of several radar picket ships operating as seaborne extensions of the command's Contiguous Radar Coverage System. She operated from her base at San Francisco, during her entire naval career, spending an average of 200 days per year actually at sea engaged in picket patrols.

That routine continued until 1 September 1965, at which time she and the remaining AGRs were placed out of commission.

Decommissioning
Her name was struck from the Navy List 1 September 1965, and she was returned to the Maritime Administration (MARAD) for lay up with the Suisun Bay Reserve Fleet, Suisun Bay, California. She remained there until 3 October 1974, when she was sold to American Ship Dismantlers for scrapping.

Honors and awards
Watchmans crew was eligible for the following medals:
 National Defense Service Medal

References

Bibliography

External links 
 

 

Liberty ships
Ships built in Panama City, Florida
1945 ships
World War II merchant ships of the United States
Guardian-class radar picket ships
Cold War auxiliary ships of the United States
James River Reserve Fleet
Suisun Bay Reserve Fleet